The British Academy Film Awards, more commonly known as the BAFTA Film Awards is a highly prestigious annual award show hosted by the British Academy of Film and Television Arts (BAFTA) to honour the best British and international contributions to film. The ceremonies were initially held at the flagship Odeon cinema in Leicester Square in London, before being held at the Royal Opera House from 2007 to 2016. From 2017 to 2022, the ceremony was held at the Royal Albert Hall in London before moving to the Royal Festival Hall for the 2023 ceremony. The statue awarded to recipients depicts a theatrical mask.

The first BAFTA Awards ceremony was held in 1949, and the ceremony was first broadcast on the BBC in 1956 with Vivien Leigh as the host. The ceremony was initially held in April or May; since 2001, it typically takes place in February.

History

The British Academy of Film and Television Arts (BAFTA) was founded in 1947 as The British Film Academy, by David Lean, Alexander Korda, Carol Reed, Charles Laughton, Roger Manvell, Laurence Olivier, Emeric Pressburger, Michael Powell, Michael Balcon, and other major figures of the British film industry. In 1958, the Academy merged with The Guild of Television Producers and Directors to form The Society of Film and Television, which eventually became The British Academy of Film and Television Arts in 1976.

The stated charitable purpose of BAFTA is to "support, develop and promote the art forms of the moving image, by identifying and rewarding excellence, inspiring practitioners, and benefiting the public". In addition to high-profile awards ceremonies, BAFTA runs a year-round programme of educational events, including film screenings and tribute evenings. BAFTA is supported by a membership of about 6,000 people from the film, television, and video game industries.

The Academy's awards are in the form of a theatrical mask designed by American sculptor Mitzi Cunliffe, in response to a commission from the Guild of Television Producers in 1955.

Annual ceremony

The ceremony previously took place in April or May, but since 2001 it has been held in February in order to precede the Academy Awards. Most of the awards are open to all nationalities, though there are awards for Outstanding British Film and Outstanding Debut by a British Writer, Producer or Director. Only UK films are eligible for the categories of The British Short Film and British Short Animation awards.

During each annual ceremony, BAFTA pauses in memoriam to pay tribute to those in the industry who have died over the past 12 months, showcasing a montage of images accompanied by music.

Broadcast
The Awards ceremony is delayed broadcast on British television the same evening, and across the world. The first broadcast was on the BBC in 1956, with Vivien Leigh (who would present an award to her husband Sir Laurence Olivier) as the host. It has been broadcast in colour since 1970. In the US it is broadcast on BBC America.

Location
The award ceremony is held in London. From 2000 to 2007, the ceremonies took place at the flagship Odeon Leicester cinema in Leicester Square. Between 2008 and 2016, the ceremonies took place at the Royal Opera House. The 70th Awards in 2017, and subsequent ceremonies up to the 75th Awards in 2022, were held at the Royal Albert Hall.

For the 76th British Academy Film Awards in 2023, it was announced that the ceremony would be moved to the Royal Festival Hall as part of a new multi-year deal between BAFTA and the Southbank Centre, bringing the Film Awards in-line with the British Academy Television Awards and British Academy Games Awards, which were already held there.

Sponsorship
Until 2012, the mobile telephone network Orange sponsored the awards. Orange's parent company, EE, took over the sponsorship of the event from 2013.

Award categories

Retired awards
 BAFTA Award for Most Promising Newcomer to Leading Film Roles (awarded 1952–1984)
 BAFTA Award for Best British Screenplay (awarded 1955–1968)
 BAFTA Award for Best Screenplay (awarded 1969–1983)
 BAFTA Award for Best British Actor (awarded 1952–1967)
 BAFTA Award for Best Foreign Actor (awarded 1952–1967)
 BAFTA Award for Best British Actress (awarded 1952–1967)
 BAFTA Award for Best Foreign Actress (awarded 1952–1967)
 BAFTA Award for Best Original Song (awarded 1983–1985)
 BAFTA Award for Best Factual Film
 BAFTA Award for Best Fictional Film
 BAFTA Award for Best Short Factual Film
 BAFTA Award for Best Specialised Film
 BAFTA John Grierson Award
 BAFTA United Nations Award (awarded 1949–1976)

Special awards
 BAFTA Fellowship (since 1971)
 Outstanding British Contribution to Cinema Award (known as the Michael Balcon Award from 1979 to 2006)

Superlatives

Acting

Directing

Other
 Most awards won by a single film
 Butch Cassidy and the Sundance Kid (1969), with 9 wins.
 Most nominations received by a single film
 Gandhi (1982), with 16 nominations.
 Most nominations without winning an award
 Women in Love (1969) and Finding Neverland (2004), with 11 nominations each.
 Oldest person to win an award
 Emmanuelle Riva winning Best Actress in a Leading Role for Amour (84 years old).
 Youngest person to win an award
 Jodie Foster winning Best Actress in a Supporting Role for Bugsy Malone  and Taxi Driver (13 years old).

Ceremonies

See also
 British Academy of Film and Television Arts
 British Academy Television Awards

References

External links

 
 BAFTA Awards database
 Museum of Broadcast Communications: BAFTA
 IMDB: BAFTA

Film
British film awards
Awards established in 1947
British television specials
1947 establishments in the United Kingdom
Annual events in the United Kingdom